Carnegie Castle was a castle that was located in Angus, Scotland. The Carnegies owned the property between the 15th-18th century. The site of the castle is now farmland. No remains above ground are visible.

References

Castles in Angus, Scotland
Buildings and structures in Angus, Scotland
Demolished buildings and structures in Scotland
Former castles in Scotland